The Seattle 4-3 hybrid is a defense created by Pete Carroll and Dan Quinn and was used by the Seattle Seahawks to great success in the 2013 and 2014 seasons. The defense has a four man defensive line, but incorporates defensive principles more commonly seen in three man lines. The defense has more specialized roles than most, and this allowed them to take advantage of "market inefficiencies", to use players that other defenses could not. It also features a pass defense scheme that improves run defense.

In depth 

The Seattle 4-3 hybrid defense is based on the 4-3 under front used heavily by Monte Kiffin. Unlike the standard 4-3 under, in which all the defensive linemen employ 1 gap techniques, the Seattle variant has a split personality. In its best known form, half the line uses 3-4 two gap principles, while the other half acts like a one gap 4-3.

Also unlike many defenses, where a defender on the right side is always on the right, the Seattle 4-3 shifts specific players to the strong side of the formation, as determined by the position of the tight end. The strong side defensive end is also called the "big end". Other positions include the nose tackle, the 3 technique tackle, and the Leo, a defensive end - rush linebacker hybrid. The big end and the nose tackle use a 2 gap technique, while the 3 technique and the Leo use a 1 gap technique. 

This defensive front is usually coupled with a Cover 3 defensive backfield where a safety comes down to about linebacker depth. This puts eight men close to the line of scrimmage. The combination of two 2 gap defensive linemen and "8 in the box" means the formation is powerful against the run. The Cover 3 as employed by Seattle 4-3 users also emphasizes the size of their defensive backs, with for example, Richard Sherman at 6' 3".

To further defend against the run, the 4-3 under front can be reduced. In a reduced front, the big end moves from the outside shoulder of the strong side tackle to the inside shoulder. It subsequently becomes much harder for an offense to run into the strong side B gap.

History 

In 2010, in order to get a bigger front in order to defend the run, Pete Carroll introduced two gap techniques into his 4-3 under. This was also about the time Dan Quinn convinced Red Bryant to play the big end position, to make use of his ability to two gap The resulting hybrid front became successful. In part, it was successful by finding functional use of players like Kam Chancellor, who would have been regarded as a positionless "tweener" by more traditional NFL defenses. By 2013, this scheme helped lead the Seattle Seahawks to two Super Bowls, and was so effective the defensive secondary acquired its own nickname, the Legion of Boom.

In the modern era, coaches that use this defense include Pete Carroll, Dan Quinn, Gus Bradley and Robert Saleh. At least as early as 2012, Bill Belichick incorporated these fronts as part of his 4-3 hybrid defense. In 2019, Robert Saleh switched the base defense of the San Francisco 49ers from the Seattle front to a wide 9 front, with a Cover 2 back end.

Notes

References 

Seattle Seahawks
American football formations